Razdolye is a rural locality (a khutor) in Kosteltsevsky Selsoviet Rural Settlement, Kurchatovsky District, Kursk Oblast, Russia. Population:

Geography 
The khutor is located in the Ruda River basin (a tributary of the Usozha in the basin of the Svapa), 82 km from the Russia–Ukraine border, 42.5 km north-west of Kursk, 27 km north of the district center – the town Kurchatov, 10 km from the selsoviet center – Kosteltsevo.

 Climate
Razdolye has a warm-summer humid continental climate (Dfb in the Köppen climate classification).

Transport 
Razdolye is located 22.5 km from the federal route  Crimea Highway, 26.5 km from the road of regional importance  (Kursk – Lgov – Rylsk – border with Ukraine), 16.5 km from the road  (Lgov – Konyshyovka), 4 km from the road of intermunicipal significance  (38K-017 – Nikolayevka – Shirkovo), 22.5 km from the nearest railway halt 552 km (railway line Navlya – Lgov-Kiyevsky).

The rural locality is situated 47.5 km from Kursk Vostochny Airport, 153 km from Belgorod International Airport and 247 km from Voronezh Peter the Great Airport.

References

Notes

Sources

Rural localities in Kurchatovsky District, Kursk Oblast